Josh Bean (born November 10, 1982) is a former Canadian football linebacker. He was drafted by the BC Lions of the Canadian Football League in the second round of the 2007 CFL Draft. He played college football for the Boise State Broncos.

External links
BC Lions bio

1982 births
Living people
BC Lions players
Boise State Broncos football players
Canadian football linebackers
Edmonton Elks players
Canadian football people from Calgary
Players of Canadian football from Alberta